Weaning is a 2013 Chinese romance/family TV series starring Tong Liya and Lei Jiayin. While a love story at heart, the show also explores the Chinese issue of overprotective parents and overdependent children (some of whom need to be "weaned" in their 30s).

Ratings

Broadcast
 China
Regional (terrestrial) channels: Tianjin Television (April 26, 2013), Wuhan Television (April 26, 2013), Shaanxi Television (May 3, 2013), Shandong Television (May 5, 2013), Heilongjiang Television (May 2013), Henan Television (May 2013), Shanghai Television (September 5, 2013, dubbed in Shanghainese), etc.
National (satellite) channels: Dragon Television (May 28, 2013), Hebei Television (July 11, 2013)
 United States: KSCI (March 10, 2014)
 Taiwan: TNTV (June 2, 2014)

Awards
2014 13th Huading Awards
Won—Best Actress in a Television Series, Tong Liya
Nominated—Best Actor in a Contemporary Drama Series, Lei Jiayin

See also
How Long Will I Love U, a 2018 film starring Lei and Tong

References

2013 Chinese television series endings
2013 Chinese television series debuts
Chinese romance television series
Television shows set in Shanghai
Mandarin-language television shows
Television series by SMG Pictures